The 2008 Deutschland Tour road cycling race took place from August 29 to September 6, 2008 in Germany and Austria. It was won by Team Columbia's Linus Gerdemann of Germany. It was the 32nd edition of the Deutschland Tour, and the last edition until the race's revival in 2018.

Stages

Prologue Kitzbühel 3.6 km Friday, August 29

Stage 1 Kitzbühel–Hochfügen 178 km Saturday, August 30

Stage 2 Munich–Hesselberg 183 km Sunday, August 31

Stage 3 Herrieden–Wiesloch 214.9 km Monday, September 1

Stage 4 Wiesloch–Mainz 174 km Tuesday, September 2

Stage 5 Mainz–Winterberg 218.4 km Wednesday, September 3

Stage 6 Schmallenberg–Neuss 188.8 km Thursday, September 4

Stage 7 Neuss–Georgsmarienhütte 214.3 km Friday, September 5

Stage 8 - September 6, 2008: >

Jersey progress

External links
2008 in Road Cycling

References

2008 UCI ProTour
2008 Deutschland Tour
2008 in Austrian sport
2008 in German sport